Pleasant Valley Township may refer to:

Illinois
 Pleasant Valley Township, Jo Daviess County, Illinois

Iowa
 Pleasant Valley Township, Carroll County, Iowa
 Pleasant Valley Township, Cerro Gordo County, Iowa
 Pleasant Valley Township, Fayette County, Iowa
 Pleasant Valley Township, Grundy County, Iowa
 Pleasant Valley Township, Johnson County, Iowa
 Pleasant Valley Township, Scott County, Iowa
 Pleasant Valley Township, Webster County, Iowa

Kansas
 Pleasant Valley Township, Cowley County, Kansas
 Pleasant Valley Township, Decatur County, Kansas
 Pleasant Valley Township, Finney County, Kansas
 Pleasant Valley Township, Pawnee County, Kansas, in Pawnee County, Kansas
 Pleasant Valley Township, Saline County, Kansas
 Pleasant Valley Township, Wilson County, Kansas

Minnesota
 Pleasant Valley Township, Mower County, Minnesota

Missouri
 Pleasant Valley Township, Wright County, Missouri

Nebraska
 Pleasant Valley Township, Dodge County, Nebraska

North Dakota
 Pleasant Valley Township, Williams County, North Dakota, in Williams County, North Dakota

Pennsylvania
 Pleasant Valley Township, Potter County, Pennsylvania

South Dakota
 Pleasant Valley Township, Aurora County, South Dakota, in Aurora County, South Dakota
 Pleasant Valley Township, Clay County, South Dakota, in Clay County, South Dakota
 Pleasant Valley Township, Gregory County, South Dakota, in Gregory County, South Dakota
 Pleasant Valley Township, Hand County, South Dakota, in Hand County, South Dakota
 Pleasant Valley Township, Marshall County, South Dakota, in Marshall County, South Dakota
 Pleasant Valley Township, Tripp County, South Dakota, in Tripp County, South Dakota

Township name disambiguation pages